Toromono (Toromona) is a Western Tacanan language. 200 Toromono were reported in 1983, but they have not been located since.

External links

Languages of Bolivia
Tacanan languages